Pasupuleti Purna Chandra Rao (May 22, 1948 – October 11, 2019) was an Indian theatre activist, film editor and critic. In 2014, he garnered the National Film Award for Best Book on Cinema for his book on silent cinema titled Silent Cinema (1895–1930) at the 62nd National Film Awards by then President, Pranab Mukherjee.

Awards
National Film Awards
National Film Award for Best Book on Cinema (2014) – Silent Cinema (1895-1930)

References

Indian male journalists
Indian film critics
2019 deaths
Telugu people
Telugu cinema
1948 births